is a Japanese manga series written and illustrated by Satoshi Yoshida. It was serialized in Shogakukan's seinen manga magazine Monthly Big Comic Spirits from February 2011 to November 2020.

Publication
It later debuted as a serialized manga in the same magazine, being published from December 20, 2010, to January 17, 2011. It was then transferred to Monthly Big Comic Spirits, being serialized from February 26, 2011, to March 27, 2013. Shogakukan collected its chapters in six tankōbon volumes, released from July 29, 2011, to May 30, 2013

Volume list

References

Seinen manga
Shogakukan manga